Foster Samuel Chipman was a U.S. politician, who was the tenth Mayor of Orlando from 1887 to 1888.

References

Mayors of Orlando, Florida
1829 births
Year of death unknown